Watford station may refer to:

Existing stations
Watford tube station
Watford High Street railway station
Watford Junction railway station
Watford North railway station

Stations not in use
Watford railway station (1837-1858) (closed)
Watford Central tube station (planned but never built)
Watford West railway station (closed)
Watford Stadium Halt railway station (closed)

See also
:Category:Railway stations in Watford